Patrick Harvey (born 28 November 1935) is a British modern pentathlete. He competed at the 1960 Summer Olympics.

References

External links
 

1935 births
Living people
British male modern pentathletes
Olympic modern pentathletes of Great Britain
Modern pentathletes at the 1960 Summer Olympics
Sportspeople from Guildford